David Bristow Baker (1803, Newington, Surrey – 24 July 1852) was an English religious writer.

Baker was born in 1803, the second son of David Bristow Baker, a Blackfriars merchant. He was educated at St. John's College, Cambridge, where he graduated B.A. in 1829, and M.A. in 1832. Though admitted to the Middle Temple in 1824, he was never called to the Bar. From 1841 until his death in 1852 he was perpetual curate of Claygate, Surrey. He was the author of A treatise on the nature and causes of doubt, in religious questions: with a particular reference to Christianity (1831) and Discourses and sacramental Addresses to a Village Congregation (1832).

References

1803 births
1852 deaths
English religious writers
Alumni of St John's College, Cambridge
19th-century English non-fiction writers